Moyna Assembly constituency is an assembly constituency in Purba Medinipur district in the Indian state of West Bengal.

Overview
As per orders of the Delimitation Commission, No. 206 Moyna Assembly constituency is composed of the following: Moyna community development block, Anantapur I, Anantapur II, Nilkunthia, Sreerampur I and Sreerampur II gram panchayats of Tamluk community development block.

Moyna Assembly constituency is part of No. 30 Tamluk (Lok Sabha constituency).

Election results

2021

2016

Result:
http://www.indiavotes.com/ac/details/9/36873/249

2011

  

.# Swing calculated on Congress+Trinamool Congress vote percentages taken together in 2006.

1977-2006
In the state assembly elections in 2006, Sk Mujibur Rahman of CPI(M) won the 206 Moyna assembly seat defeating his nearest rival Prafulla Kumar Barai of Trinamool Congress. Contests in most years were multi cornered but only winners and runners are being mentioned. Dipak Bera of CPI(M) defeated Bhusan Chandra Dolai of Trinamool Congress in 2001, and Manik Bhowmik of Congress in 1996. Manik Bhowmik of Congress defeated Dipak Bera of CPI(M) in 1991. Pulin Bera of CPI(M) defeated Rekharani Deb of Congress in 1987. Pulak Bera of CPI(M) defeated Bhusan Chandra Doloi of Congress in 1982 and 1977.

1951-1972
Kanai Lal Bhowmick of CPI won in 1972, 1971, 1969 and 1967. Ananga Mohan Das of Congress won in 1962 and 1957. In independent India's first election in 1951, Kanai Lal Bhowmick of CPI won the Moyna seat.

References

Assembly constituencies of West Bengal
Politics of Purba Medinipur district